Giuseppe Bernardis (born 5 January 1948) is a retired Italian Air Force general. He served as Chief of Staff of the Italian Air Force from 25 February 2010 to 25 February 2013. Pasquale Preziosa was appointed as his successor.

Honour 
 : Knight Grand Cross of the Order of Merit of the Italian Republic (24 february 2010)

References 

Living people
1948 births
Place of birth missing (living people)
Italian aviators
Italian Air Force generals
Knights Grand Cross of the Order of Merit of the Italian Republic
20th-century Italian people